Robert Nouzaret (born 29 September 1943) is a French football manager and former player.

Managerial career
On 31 August 2011, Nouzaret resigned as DR Congo coach following a difference in opinion with the football federation over the Frenchman’s assistants.

References

1943 births
Living people
Footballers from Marseille
Association football midfielders
French footballers
Ligue 1 players
Olympique Lyonnais players
FC Girondins de Bordeaux players
Montpellier HSC players
FC Gueugnon players
US Orléans players
French football managers
Ligue 1 managers
Montpellier HSC managers
Bourges 18 managers
Olympique Lyonnais managers
Stade Malherbe Caen managers
AS Saint-Étienne managers
Toulouse FC managers
SC Bastia managers
MC Alger managers
Ivory Coast national football team managers
Guinea national football team managers
Democratic Republic of the Congo national football team managers
Expatriate football managers in Ivory Coast
Expatriate football managers in Guinea
Expatriate football managers in the Democratic Republic of the Congo
Expatriate football managers in Algeria
1998 African Cup of Nations managers
2008 Africa Cup of Nations managers